Hel Bór is a former PKP railway station in Hel (Pomeranian Voivodeship), Poland. The station was used for military base service.

Lines crossing the station

References 
Bór article at Polish Stations Database, URL accessed at 5 March 2006

Railway stations in Pomeranian Voivodeship
Disused railway stations in Pomeranian Voivodeship
Puck County